Chy Davidson (born May 9, 1959) is a former American football wide receiver who played two seasons with the New York Jets of the National Football League (NFL). He was drafted by the New England Patriots in the eleventh round of the 1981 NFL Supplemental Draft. He played college football at the University of Rhode Island and attended Bayside High School in Queens, New York. Davidson was also a member of the Washington Redskins and Washington Federals.

Early years
Davidson played high school football for the Bayside High School Commodores. He set the all-time scoring record for the Commodores with 28 touchdowns in a single season.

Professional career
Davidson was selected by the New England Patriots of the NFL in the eleventh round of the 1981 NFL Supplemental Draft. He was released by the Patriots on August 24, 1981. He signed with the NFL's Washington Redskins during the 1982 off-season. Davidson was released by the Redskins on September 6, 1982. He signed with the Washington Federals of the United States Football League on January 21, 1983. He was by the Federals released on February 28, 1983. Davidson was signed by the New York Jets of the NFL on April 10, 1984. He played in four games for the Jets from 1984 to 1985. He was released by the Jets on September 12, 1985.

References

External links
Just Sports Stats

Living people
1959 births
American football wide receivers
African-American players of American football
Rhode Island Rams football players
New England Patriots players
Washington Redskins players
Washington Federals/Orlando Renegades players
New York Jets players
Sportspeople from Queens, New York
Players of American football from New York City
Bayside High School (Queens) alumni
21st-century African-American people
20th-century African-American sportspeople